The Ed Chynoweth Cup is an ice hockey club championship trophy awarded to the playoff champion of the Western Hockey League (WHL).  Originally called the President's Cup when the league was founded in 1966, the trophy was renamed in 2007 to honour Ed Chynoweth's long service to junior hockey in Canada.  The WHL champion earns a berth into the Memorial Cup tournament, Canada's major junior championship.  The Kamloops Blazers have won the most championships with six, followed by the Medicine Hat Tigers with five.  The Spokane Chiefs were the first team to win the renamed trophy in the 2007–08 WHL season. The current (2021-22) holders of the Ed Chynoweth Cup are the Edmonton Oil Kings.

History
The WHL was founded in 1966 by seven teams from Alberta and Saskatchewan who were hoping to improve the quality of junior hockey in western Canada.  Despite gaining approval from the governing bodies of both provinces, the Canadian Amateur Hockey Association (CAHA) objected to the formation of the interprovincial league, refusing to sanction the circuit and suspending all players and officials who participated in the league from participation in any CAHA league or event.  Declared an "outlaw league" by the CAHA, the WHL's founders chose to play on, though the league was ruled ineligible to participate in the Memorial Cup, Canada's national junior championship.

The first President's Cup champion was the Moose Jaw Canucks in 1967.  In 1971, the CAHA reorganized the top level of junior hockey into two tiers, sanctioning the WHL as the top league in western Canada and one of three leagues that formed the "Major-Junior" tier, the others being the Ontario Hockey Association (OHA) (today the Ontario Hockey League (OHL)) and Quebec Major Junior Hockey League (QMJHL),  The 1971 champion Edmonton Oil Kings thus faced the Quebec Remparts in the 1972 Memorial Cup final, though, it nearly failed to materialize as the OHA and QMJHL initially refused to face the western champion.  The Oil Kings were defeated by Quebec in an abbreviated series. The two teams played a best-of-three series, in which the first team with two victories won the title, as opposed to the normal best-of-seven (first team to four wins).  Three years later, in 1974, the Regina Pats became the first WHL champion to win the national title.

The New Westminster Bruins emerged as the first dynasty in league history, winning four consecutive championships between 1975 and 1978, along with two Memorial Cups in 1977 and 1978.  In 1976, the Portland Winter Hawks became the first American-based team in the WHL.  Six years later, the 1981–82 Winter Hawks recorded more firsts, becoming the first American team to win the President's Cup as well as the first American team to compete for the Memorial Cup.  One year later, the Winter Hawks won the 1983 Memorial Cup becoming the first American champion, and the first to win the Memorial Cup without winning its own league title, as Portland hosted the tournament and was guaranteed a spot in the tournament despite losing the WHL final to the Lethbridge Broncos.

On December 30, 1986, four members of the Swift Current Broncos—Scott Kruger, Trent Kresse, Brent Ruff and Chris Mantyka—were killed when the team bus crashed outside Swift Current.  The community rallied around the team, and less than three years later, the Broncos emerged as the top team in the Canadian Hockey League (CHL). Featuring Scott Kruger's younger brothers Darren and Trevor, the 1988–89 Broncos became the first team in WHL history to sweep their way through the playoffs, winning the President's Cup without losing a single game in the post-season.  The Broncos faced the host Saskatoon Blades in the 1989 Memorial Cup final, defeating their provincial rivals in the first all-WHL national championship.  The Kamloops Blazers dominated the WHL in the early 1990s, capturing four league championships between 1990 and 1995 and three Memorial Cups to cap a period where WHL teams won seven Memorial Cup championships in a nine-year period between 1987 and 1995.

In 2007, the league renamed the championship trophy the Ed Chynoweth Cup in honour of Ed Chynoweth's long tenure with the league. Chynoweth had served as president of both the WHL and CHL, from 1972 and 1975 respectively, until leaving both posts in 1995 to form the Edmonton Ice. He remained with the franchise through its transfer to Kootenay until his death in 2008.  Chynoweth was described by Ontario Hockey League commissioner David Branch as being "the architect of the Canadian Hockey League as we know it today". Chynoweth was posthumously elected to the Hockey Hall of Fame in 2008.

List of winners
Number in parenthesis denotes total championships won to that point

By season

By team

See also
J. Ross Robertson Cup — OHL championship
President's Cup — QMJHL championship
List of Memorial Cup champions

Notes
In some playoff years, ties were possible, and are noted in win–loss–tie format
The league did not receive official sanctioning by the Canadian Amateur Hockey Association until 1971, and thus was not eligible to compete for the Memorial Cup between 1967 and 1970. In spite of this, the 1968 Estevan Bruins did compete in the Memorial Cup final, the only team in the WHL's first four years permitted to do so.
Portland qualified for the 1983 Memorial Cup as the host team.
Portland qualified for the 1986 Memorial Cup as the host team after New Westminster withdrew as the host.
Saskatoon qualified for the 1989 Memorial Cup as the host team.
Seattle qualified for the 1992 Memorial Cup as the host team.
Kamloops both hosted the 1995 Memorial Cup and qualified as the league winner.  As the losing finalist, Brandon played as the WHL's second representative.
Spokane qualified for the 1998 Memorial Cup as the host team.
Regina qualified for the 2001 Memorial Cup as the host team.
Kelowna qualified for the 2004 Memorial Cup as the host team.
Vancouver qualified for the 2007 Memorial Cup as the host team.
Brandon qualified for the 2010 Memorial Cup as the host team.
Saskatoon qualified for the 2013 Memorial Cup as the host team.

References
General

Specific

Western Hockey League trophies and awards
Ice hockey tournaments in Canada